Gulshanabad meaning City of Rose garden. It may refer to:

Pakistan
 Gulshanabad (Rawalpindi) is located in Rawalpindi, Punjab, Pakistan

India
Srikakulam prior to 1759
Medak until the rule of Nizam
Nashik, India from 1487 to 1818

See also
Golshanabad (disambiguation)